A Few Seconds Before Happiness is a 1956 black-and-white photograph that depicts a man holding a puppy behind his back with his right hand, about to present it to a young boy. The photograph went viral after it was posted to Twitter by English street artist Banksy on November 28, 2017.

References

1950s photographs
Black-and-white photographs